John Meshullam (1799–1878) was a British born Jew. His family was killed on their way to Jerusalem in riots between Turks and Greeks. John as the only surviving sibling inherited the considerable family assets. John then moved to Berlin to study the German language and decided to move to the Levant. There he came to know Joseph Wolff, then missioning for the London Society for Promoting Christianity Among the Jews, and converted to Anglican Christianity. In 1840 he moved with his wife and children to Jerusalem.

Meshullam played a part in establishing the agricultural farm at Artas in 1850 in Palestine. In 1850 he leased lands in Artas to the Mennonite Peter Claaßen (1809–1865) and his brother Isaac (1815–1850) from Tiegen in West Prussia (a part of today's Nowy Dwór Gdański), whose families moved to Artas but left again between 1851 and 1853 for Jaffa. By the end of 1853 another group of leaseholders around Clorinda S. Minor left too, following a dispute with Meshullam.

Meshullam was buried in Jerusalem and his grave is preserved in the Protestant Mount Zion Cemetery.

References

Bibliography
 Clorinda S. Minor, Meshullam!: Or, Tidings from Jerusalem (11850), Philadelphia (Penns.): 21851, pp. 96–114, also reprint New York: Arno Press, 31977, .

1799 births
1878 deaths
British Jews
Converts to Anglicanism from Judaism
Burials at Mount Zion (Protestant)